William Francis Tunnicliffe (5 January 1920 – 1997) was a professional footballer who played outside-left at Port Vale, Bournemouth & Boscombe Athletic, Wrexham, Bradford City, and Stafford Rangers. He made 377 league appearances in the Football League, mostly for Wrexham.

Career
Tunnicliffe joined Port Vale in January 1937, and made his debut at The Old Recreation Ground in a 2–1 victory over Rotherham United on 6 February. He played one further game in the Third Division North in the 1936–37 season, and featured in one league and one FA Cup game in the 1937–38 campaign. He was given a free transfer to Bournemouth & Boscombe Athletic in May 1938. The "Cherries" finished 15th in the Third Division South in 1938–39, before competitive football was put on hold throughout World War II. He returned to Port Vale as a guest in October 1939, and scored ten goals in twenty games of the 1939–40 season, before departing again in April 1940. He also guested for Chester and Reading, before returning to Bournemouth. Under the stewardship of Harry Kinghorn, Bournemouth finished seventh in 1946–47. Tunnicliffe scored seven goals in 49 league games at Dean Court, before switching to Welsh club Wrexham. The "Dragons" finished third in the Third Division North in 1947–48, though were ten points behind champions Lincoln City. They dropped down to ninth place in 1948–49, before finishing just two places and one point ahead of bottom club York City in 1949–50. After manager Les McDowall was replaced by Peter Jackson, Wrexham rose to 14th position in 1950–51, and posted an 18th-place finish in 1951–52. Wrexham made a genuine bid for promotion in the 1952–53 season, but again finished in third place, just three points behind leaders Oldham Athletic. In total, Tunnicliffe made 236 league appearances, scoring 74 goals in his six years at the Racecourse Ground. In 1953 he signed for league rivals Bradford City, where he spent two-and-a-half seasons, scoring 20 goals in 89 league matches. Ivor Powell's "Citizens" finished fifth in 1953–54, before dropping down to 21st position in 1954–55; Tunnicliffe finished as the "Bantams" top-scorer in 1954–55, despite only finding the net seven times during the campaign. He then left both Valley Parade and the Football League to join Cheshire County League side Stafford Rangers.

Career statistics
Source:

References

1920 births
1997 deaths
Footballers from Stoke-on-Trent
English footballers
Association football outside forwards
Port Vale F.C. players
AFC Bournemouth players
Port Vale F.C. wartime guest players
Chester City F.C. wartime guest players
Reading F.C. wartime guest players
Stoke City F.C. wartime guest players
Wrexham A.F.C. players
Bradford City A.F.C. players
Stafford Rangers F.C. players
English Football League players